Timothy "Tim" Sullivan (born 21 February 1958) is a German-born British film and television director and screenwriter, known for his work with Granada Television and his feature film Jack and Sarah (1995).

Background 
Tim Sullivan was born in Germany, where his father was stationed with the Royal Air Force. He attended Clifton College in Bristol, England before gaining an exhibition scholarship to read English and Law at the University of Cambridge. While at Cambridge, Sullivan was a member of the Cambridge University Amateur Dramatic Club, and partnered with writer Richard Maher on the play Klev, which ran at the Crown Theatre, Hill Place in 1978. He also supplied extras to Chariots of Fire (1981). After leaving Cambridge Sullivan got a summer job as a chauffeur to Anthony Andrews on the production of Brideshead Revisited. The producer Derek Granger learned that Sullivan was writing a screenplay with Derek Jarman (Bob Upadown), and encouraged him to get a job as a researcher with Granada Television.

Career 
After working as a researcher on the first series of Alfresco, Sullivan and Richard Maher partnered to write their first television series, a sitcom entitled The Train Now Leaving, set in the dining carriage of an InterCity train running between London and Manchester. Granada commissioned seven 30-minute scripts for development.

Sullivan stayed at Granada for several more years, directing episodes of series such as Busman's Holiday, Stop That Laughing at the Back, Coronation Street and The Case Book of Sherlock Holmes, as well as adapting A Handful of Dust for television (1988) and directing Thatcher: The Final Days (1991). In 1995, Sullivan wrote and directed his first feature film, Jack and Sarah, starring Richard E. Grant and Samantha Mathis. The film was inspired by the attention a male colleague at Granada received when his childcare arrangements broke down and he had to bring his child into work.

Into the 2000s, Sullivan worked freelance on many television and film projects, including directing the final episode of Cold Feet for Granada, and the one-off comedy drama Catwalk Dogs for Shed Productions. In 2005, having worked on the movie Flushed Away, Sullivan was hired by DreamWorks to write an initial script draft for Shrek 4, though his script was abandoned by the time production on the film began.

Sullivan wrote the film Letters to Juliet, starring Amanda Seyfried, which was released in the United States in 2010, taking over $80 million worldwide. He has been developing a film based on the London Marathon and another The Wedding Dress. He has worked with many notable directors and producers in the US including Ron Howard, Scott Rudin and Jeffrey Katzenberg.  

In 2020, Sullivan self-published two crime novels featuring the detective DS George Cross, The Dentist and The Cyclist, within four months the two titles achieved over 200,000 downloads and he was signed by British publisher Head of Zeus. The third novel in the DS Cross series, The Patient was published in March 2022 and the fourth book, The Politician was published on 10 November 2022.

Filmography

References 

Tim Sullivan filmography". British Film Institute. Retrieved on 17 April 2010.

External links 
Tim Sullivan at United Agents

"Lights, camera, action" – Profile of Sullivan in Optima, the Fitzwilliam College alumni newsletter (p. 10).
www.timsullivan.co.uk

1958 births
Alumni of Fitzwilliam College, Cambridge
British film directors
British male screenwriters
British television directors
Living people
People educated at Clifton College